The National Association of Theatre Owners (NATO) is an American trade organization whose members are the owners of movie theaters. Most of the worldwide major theater chains' operators are members, as are hundreds of independent theater operators; collectively, they account for the operation of over 35,000 motion picture screens in all 50 U.S. states and over 33,000 screens in 100 other countries.

NATO was founded in 1965 by the merger of the largest movie theater trade organizations, the Theater Owners of America and the Allied States Association of Motion Picture Exhibitors.

The long-running official magazine of NATO is Boxoffice; between 2001 and 2007, they also published In Focus.

History
As the motion picture industry became larger, movie production companies began consolidating and controlling distribution. The largest producer, Famous Players-Lasky, joined and later merged with the largest distributor, Paramount (eventually becoming Paramount Pictures), and together they began block-booking in 1917, forcing theaters to buy mediocre films to get the good ones. Theaters banded together to bargain for better pricing, with 26 of the largest combining into First National Exhibitors Circuit—which went on to become a producer and distributor in its own right, before being bought by Warner Bros. By 1921, Paramount already owned 300 theaters, and other producers were catching up. Studios soon contracted with each other to keep first-runs inside the affiliated network, using this access to coerce independents into selling out.

In 1921, the first predecessor of NATO was founded, the largely affiliated Motion Picture Theater Owners of America (MPTOA), soon followed by the independent Allied States Association of Motion Picture Exhibitors (Allied), Unaffiliated Independent Motion Picture Exhibitors of America, National Independent Theatre Exhibitors, and more, to demand better pricing and access to first-runs. Unlike the others, the MPTOA embraced affiliated theaters, and soon became the largest organization.

During World War II, many theaters joined the new War Activities Committee, after the war becoming the Theatre Activities Committee and soon American Theatre Association (ATA), which strongly supported United States v. Paramount Pictures, Inc., the antitrust case against all of the major studios. A plan to merge with MPTOA, which strongly supported the studios, ran into friction, with many affiliated theaters leaving the ATA over its stance; conversely Allied, the largest purely-independent group, refused to join over the presence of affiliates. The merger went ahead in 1947, minus affiliates of Loews, RKO, and Warner Bros., and they became the Theater Owners of America (TOA) with about 10,000 theaters.

After divestiture in the fallout of the 1948 Paramount decision, many formerly-affiliated theaters ended up joining either TOA or Allied. During the post-war period, theater revenue collapsed as television became widespread, even as film rental became more expensive, and thousands of theaters closed, particularly in city centers hard hit by suburban flight. Finally, in 1966 TOA and Allied merged into the National Association of Theatre Owners, largely based on TOA's structure but headed by Marshall Fine, former Allied chairman.

The 1970s were difficult for NATO; although the blockbuster The Godfather revitalized theater-going and revenue, in 1975 a new National Independent Theatre Exhibitors (NITE) came together to challenge NATO, eventually numbering almost a thousand theaters, and governance reforms were pushed by members as well. When the reforms stalled, the entire California and Illinois chapters pulled out in 1977, along with many small chains around the nation. After 1980, many of the requested reforms were finally implemented, including a full-time president and a full-time lobbyist in Washington, as well as moving its headquarters from New York to Los Angeles; by the end of the decade, NITE had folded back into NATO, leaving only one dominant organization.

The 1980s saw a relaxation of antitrust regulation and subsequent purchasing of many chains by distributors and large conglomerates, including 120 theaters by Paramount and Warner; by the end of the decade, consolidation left the top 10 owners in control of 55 percent of the industry. In the 1990s, theater growth exploded, and by 1999, movie screens peaked at 36,448, the vast majority of which were affiliated with NATO.

Events

CinemaCon
As ShoWest, the convention was formerly one of four major worldwide annual events owned by the Film Group unit of Nielsen Business Media before being sold in 2011 to e5 Global Media and operated exclusively by NATO.

In now-renamed CinemaCon in 2011, the convention is NATO's only official convention of theater owners controlled by the organization itself. The first gathering took place March 2011 at Caesars Palace in Las Vegas, Nevada, with the second held April 23–26, 2012, at the same venue.

CinemaCon is now a standalone movie theater industry trade show or exposition originally established by NATO in 1975, usually held in Las Vegas in March.

On March 11, 2020, NATO canceled CinemaCon 2020 due to the COVID-19 pandemic.

ShoWest Convention 1976

 George Barrie – Producer of the Year Award

ShoWest Convention 1978

 George Lucas – Director of the Year Award
 Mark Hamill – Male Star of Tomorrow Award
 Henry Winkler – Male Star of the Year Award
 Robert Mitchum – Lifetime Achievement Award

ShoWest Convention 1979

 Jane Fonda – Female Star of the Year Award
 Jon Voight –Male Star of the Year Award
 Sylvester Stallone – Star of the Year Award
 Michael Douglas – Star/Producer of the Year Award

ShoWest Convention 1981

 George Hamilton – Showman of the Year Award

ShoWest Convention 1982

 Steven Spielberg – Director of the Year Award
 Frank Marshall – Producer of the Year Award
 Pia Zadora – Young Star of the Year Award
 Chuck Norris – Action Star of the Year Award
 Rich Little – Entertainer of the Year Award
 Clint Eastwood – Male Star of the Decade Award
 Lori Singer – Newcomer of the Year Award
 Sean Connery – Worldwide Star of the Year Award

ShoWest Convention 1983

 Taylor Hackford – Director of the Year Award
 Shelley Long – Female Star of Tomorrow Award
 Debra Winger – Female Star of the Year Award
 David Keith – Male Star of Tomorrow Award
 Richard Gere – Male Star of the Year Award
 Sydney Pollack – Producer of the Year Award
 Louis Gossett, Jr. – Best Supporting Actor Award

ShoWest Convention 1984

 Lori Singer – Breakthrough Performer of the Year Award
 Sylvester Stallone – Star of Stars Award
 Charlton Heston – Lifetime Achievement Award

ShoWest Convention 1985

 Kelly LeBrock – Female Star of Tomorrow Award
 Eric Stoltz – Male Star of Tomorrow Award
 Arnold Schwarzenegger – International Star of the Year Award
 Eddie Murphy – Star of the Year Award

ShoWest Convention 1986

 Roy Scheider – Career Achievement Award

ShoWest Convention 1987

 Leonard Nimoy – Director of the Year Award
 Paul Hogan – Male Star of the Year Award
 Tom Cruise – Box Office Star of the Year Award

ShoWest Convention 1988

 Bette Midler – Female Star of the Year Award
 Don Johnson – Male Star of the Year Award

ShoWest Convention 1989

 James L. Brooks – Director of the Year Award
 Carey Lowell & Talisa Soto – Female Star of Tomorrow Award
 Glenn Close – Female Star of the Year Award
 Danny DeVito – Male Star of the Year Award
 David Zucker, Jerry Zucker, Robert K. Weiss & Jim Abrahams – Comedy Filmmakers of the Year Award
 Leslie Nielsen – Male Comedy Star of the Year Award

ShoWest Convention 1990

 Tim Burton – Director of the Year Award
 Winona Ryder – Female Star of Tomorrow Award
 Anjelica Huston – Female Star of the Year Award
 Johnny Depp – Male Star of Tomorrow Award
 Jeff Bridges – Male Star of the Year Award
 Joel Silver – Producer of the Year Award

ShoWest Convention 1991

 Jerry Zucker – Director of the Year Award
 Robin Givens – Female Star of Tomorrow Award
 Julia Roberts – Female Star of the Year Award
 Richard Grieco – Male Star of Tomorrow Award
 Andy Garcia – Male Star of the Year Award
 John Hughes – Producer of the Year Award

ShoWest Convention 1992

 Lawrence Kasdan – Director of the Year Award
 Jodie Foster – Female Star of the Year Award
 Nicole Kidman – Female Star of Tomorrow Award
 Stephen Dorff – Male Star of Tomorrow Award
 Patrick Swayze – Male Star of the Year Award
 Brian Grazer – Producer of the Year Award
 John Singleton – Screenwriter of the Year Award
 John Singleton – Directorial Debut of the Year Award
 Chuck Norris – International Box Office Star of the Year Award
 Oliver Stone – Meritorious Achievement Award
 Cuba Gooding, Jr. – Newcomer of the Year Award
 Eddie Murphy – Star of the Decade Award

ShoWest Convention 1993

 Clint Eastwood – Director of the Year Award
 Juliette Lewis – Female Star of Tomorrow Award
 Whoopi Goldberg – Female Star of the Year Award
 Brad Pitt – Male Star of Tomorrow Award
 Mel Gibson – Male Star of the Year Award
 Mace Neufeld & Robert Rehme – Producer of the Year Award
 Richard Friedenberg – Screenwriter of the Year Award
 Arnold Schwarzenegger – International Star of the Decade Award
 George Kennedy – Special Award of Merit
 Jack Lemmon & Walter Matthau – Lifetime Achievement Award

ShoWest Convention 1994

 Steven Spielberg – Director of the Year Award
 Tia Carrere – Female Star of Tomorrow Award
 Michelle Pfeiffer – Female Star of the Year Award
 Chris O'Donnell – Male Star of Tomorrow Award
 Robin Williams – Male Star of the Year Award
 Arnold Kopelson – Producer of the Year Award
 Steven Zaillian – Screenwriter of the Year Award
 Elijah Wood – Young Star of the Year Award
 Harrison Ford – Box Office Star of the Century Award
 Kirk Douglas – Lifetime Achievement Award

ShoWest Convention 1995

 Robert Zemeckis – Director of the Year Award
 Julia Ormond – Female Star of Tomorrow Award
 Demi Moore – Female Star of the Year Award
 Martin Lawrence & Will Smith – Male Star of Tomorrow Award
 Tom Hanks – Male Star of the Year Award
 James Cameron – Producer of the Year Award
 Paul Attanasio – Screenwriter of the Year Award
 Mara Wilson – Young Star of the Year Award
 Jim Carrey – Comedy Star of the Year Award
 Christina Ricci – Star of the Year Award
 Faye Dunaway – Lifetime Achievement Award

ShoWest Convention 1996

 Mel Gibson – Director of the Year Award
 Cameron Diaz – Female Star of Tomorrow Award
 Sandra Bullock – Female Star of the Year Award
 Greg Kinnear – Male Star of Tomorrow Award
 John Travolta – Male Star of the Year Award
 James G. Robinson – Producer of the Year Award
 Edward Burns – Screenwriter of the Year Award
 Jonathan Taylor Thomas – Young Star of the Year Award
 John Lasseter – Outstanding Achievement Award
 Sophia Loren – Lifetime Achievement Award

ShoWest Convention 1997

 Joel Schumacher – Director of the Year Award
 Claire Danes – Female Star of Tomorrow Award
 Winona Ryder – Female Star of the Year Award
 Howie Long – Male Star of Tomorrow Award
 Denzel Washington – Male Star of the Year Award
 Arnon Milchan – Producer of the Year Award
 Albert Brooks & Monica Mcgowan Johnson – Screenwriter of the Year Award
 Alex D. Linz – Young Star of the Year Award
 The Rock – Favorite Movie of the Year Award
 Will Smith – International Box Office Achievement Award
 Cuba Gooding, Jr. – Supporting Actor of the Year Award
 Elizabeth Hurley – Supporting Actress of the Year Award
 Arnold Schwarzenegger – Humanitarian Award

ShoWest Convention 1998

 Anthony Hopkins – Actor of the Year Award
 Helen Hunt – Actress of the Year Award
 Barry Levinson – Director of the Year Award
 Minnie Driver – Female Star of Tomorrow Award
 Matt Damon – Male Star of Tomorrow Award
 Laurie MacDonald & Walter F. Parkes – Producer of the Year Award
 Ronald Bass – Screenwriter of the Year Award
 Burt Reynolds – Supporting Actor of the Year Award
 Joan Allen – Supporting Actress of the Year Award
 Jerry Bruckheimer – International Box Office Achievement Award
 Julia Roberts – International Star of the Year Award
 Susan Sarandon – Humanitarian Award

ShoWest Convention 1999

 Will Smith – Actor of the Year Award
 Meg Ryan – Actress of the Year Award
 John Madden – Director of the Year Award
 Heather Graham – Female Star of Tomorrow Award
 Giovanni Ribisi – Male Star of Tomorrow Award
 Jerry Bruckheimer – Producer of the Year Award
 Bobby Farrelly & Peter Farrelly – Screenwriter of the Year Award
 William H. Macy – Supporting Actor of the Year Award
 Catherine Zeta-Jones – Supporting Actress of the Year Award
 Tom Hanks – Box Office Star of the Decade Award
 Adam Sandler – Comedy Star of the Year Award
 Sean Connery – Lifetime Achievement Award

ShoWest Convention 2000

 Anthony Minghella – Director of the Year Award
 Hilary Swank – Female Star of Tomorrow Award
 Annette Bening – Female Star of the Year Award
 John Williams – Maestro of the Year Award
 Michael Clarke Duncan – Male Star of Tomorrow Award
 Jim Carrey – Male Star of the Year Award
 Armyan Bernstein – Producer of the Year Award
 Alan Ball – Screenwriter of the Year Award
 Ving Rhames – Supporting Actor of the Year Award
 Angelina Jolie – Supporting Actress of the Year Award
 Drew Barrymore – Comedy Star of the Year Award

ShoWest Convention 2001

 Wolfgang Petersen – Director of the Year Award
 Sandra Bullock – Female Star of the Year Award
 Ang Lee – International Filmmaker of the Year Award
 Michelle Yeoh – International Star of the Year Award
 Heath Ledger – Male Star of Tomorrow Award
 Russell Crowe – Male Star of the Year Award
 Richard D. Zanuck & David Brown – Producer of the Year Award
 William Broyles, Jr. – Screenwriter of the Year Award
 Haley Joel Osment – Supporting Actor of the Year Award
 Judi Dench – Supporting Actress of the Year Award
 Chris Rock – Comedy Star of the Year Award
 Nicolas Cage – Distinguished Decade of Achievement in Film Award

ShoWest Convention 2002

 Ron Howard – Director of the Year Award
 Naomi Watts – Female Star of Tomorrow Award
 Jennifer Lopez – Female Star of the Year Award
 Jean-Pierre Jeunet – International Filmmaker of the Year Award
 Josh Hartnett – Male Star of Tomorrow Award
 Will Smith – Male Star of the Year Award
 Douglas Wick – Producer of the Year Award
 Julian Fellowes – Screenwriter of the Year Award
 Marisa Tomei – Supporting Actress of the Year Award
 Chris Tucker – Comedy Star of the Year Award
 Nicole Kidman – Distinguished Decade of Achievement in Film Award
 Steven Spielberg – Lifetime Achievement Award

ShoWest Convention 2003

 Sam Mendes – Director of the Year Award
 Alison Lohman – Female Star of Tomorrow Award
 Diane Lane – Female Star of the Year Award
 Fernando Meirelles – International Achievement in Filmmaking Award
 LL Cool J – Male Star of Tomorrow Award
 Adam Sandler – Male Star of the Year Award
 David Heyman – Producer of the Year Award
 Antwone Fisher – Screenwriter of the Year Award
 Christopher Walken – Supporting Actor of the Year Award
 Catherine Zeta-Jones – Supporting Actress of the Year Award
 Chris Wedge – Animation Director of the Year Award
 Brian Grazer – Lifetime Achievement Award

ShoWest Convention 2004

 Jennifer Garner – Female Star of Tomorrow Award
 Halle Berry – Female Star of the Year Award
 Niki Caro – International Filmmaker of the Year Award
 Ryan Gosling – Male Star of Tomorrow Award
 Jude Law – Male Star of the Year Award
 John Davis – Producer of the Year Award
 Djimon Hounsou – Supporting Actor of the Year Award
 Andrew Stanton – Animation Director of the Year Award
 Jack Black – Comedy Star of the Year Award
 Drew Barrymore & Gwyneth Paltrow – Distinguished Decade of Achievement in Film Award
 Lawrence Gordon – Lifetime Achievement Award

ShoWest Convention 2005

 Rob Cohen – Director of the Year Award
 Jessica Biel – Female Star of Tomorrow Award
 Jennifer Aniston – Female Star of the Year Award
 Danny Boyle – International Filmmaker of the Year Award
 Hayden Christensen – Male Star of Tomorrow Award
 Matt Damon – Male Star of the Year Award
 Rachel McAdams – Supporting Actress of the Year Award
 Catalina Sandino Moreno – International Star of the Year Award
 George Lucas – Galactic Achievement Award

ShoWest Convention 2006

 M. Night Shyamalan – Director of the Year Award
 Jennifer Hudson – Female Star of Tomorrow Award
 Natalie Portman – Female Star of the Year Award
 Guillermo del Toro – International Achievement in Filmmaking Award
 Brandon Routh – Male Star of Tomorrow Award
 Hugh Jackman – Male Star of the Year Award
 Dakota Fanning – Supporting Actress of the Year Award
 Vince Vaughn – Comedy Star of the Year Award
 Laurence Fishburne – Distinguished Decade of Achievement in Film Award
 John Lasseter – Pioneer of Animation Award
 Keke Palmer – Rising Star of the Year Award

ShoWest Convention 2007

 Christopher Miller & Raman Hui – Animation Director of the Year Award
 Dane Cook – Breakout Performance of the Year Award
 Quentin Tarantino & Robert Rodriguez – Director of the Year Award
 Mark Burg & Oren Koules – Excellence in Producing Award
 Emma Roberts – Female Star of Tomorrow Award
 Kirsten Dunst – Female Star of the Year Award
 Alfonso Cuaron – International Achievement in Filmmaking Award
 Shia LaBeouf – Male Star of Tomorrow Award
 Don Cheadle – Male Star of the Year Award
 Jerry Weintraub – Producer of the Year Award
 Bruce Joel Rubin – Screenwriter of the Year Award
 Freddy Rodriguez – Supporting Actor of the Year Award
 Rosario Dawson – Supporting Actress of the Year Award
 Steve Carell – Comedy Star of the Year Award

ShoWest Convention 2008

 Helen Hunt – Breakthrough Director of the Year Award
 Marvin Levy – Career Achievement in Film Making Award
 Christopher Nolan – Director of the Year Award
 Brendan Fraser – Distinguished Decade of Achievement in Film Award
 David Mamet – Excellence in Filmmaking Award
 Abigail Breslin – Female Star of Tomorrow Award
 Anne Hathaway – Female Star of the Year Award
 Alan Ball – Groundbreaking Filmmaker of the Year Award
 Sergei Bodrov – International Achievement in Filmmaking Award
 Emile Hirsch – Male Star of Tomorrow Award
 Robert Downey, Jr. – Male Star of the Year Award
 Charles Roven – Producer of the Year Award
 Jim Sturgess, Kevin Spacey, Kate Bosworth, Laurence Fishburne, Aaron Yoo, Liza Lapira, Jacob Pitts & Josh Gad – Best Ensemble Award
 Seth Rogen – Comedy Star of the Year Award
 Sarah Jessica Parker – ShoWest Vanguard Award
 Ang Lee & James Schamus – ShoWest/NATO Freedom of Expression Award
 Robert Redford – Visionary Award

ShoWest Convention 2009

 Zac Efron – Breakthrough Performer of the Year Award
 Zack Snyder – Director of the Year Award
 Briana Evigan, Leah Pipes, Rumer Willis, Jamie Chung, Audrina Patridge & Margo Harshman – Female Star of Tomorrow Award
 Rachel McAdams – Female Star of the Year Award
 Chris Pine – Male Star of Tomorrow Award
 Dennis Quaid – Male Star of the Year Award
 Sienna Miller – Supporting Actor of the Year Award
 Patricia Clarkson – Independent Award for Excellence in Acting
 Kathryn Bigelow – Triumph Award for Outstanding Direction
 Roger Ebert – Career Achievement in Film Journalism
 Bradley Cooper – Comedy Star of the Year Award
 Michael Bay – ShoWest Vanguard Award for Excellence in Filmmaking
 Mark Christiansen – Ken Mason InterSociety Award
 Michael Caine – Lifetime Achievement Award

ShoWest Convention 2010

 Amanda Seyfried – Breakthrough Female Star of the Year Award
 Todd Phillips – Director of the Year Award
 Sarah Jessica Parker, Kim Cattrall, Kristin Davis & Cynthia Nixon – Ensemble Award
 Vanessa Anne Hudgens – Female Star of Tomorrow Award
 Katherine Heigl – Female Star of the Year Award
 Alex Pettyfer – Male Star of Tomorrow Award
 Sam Worthington – Male Star of the Year Award
 Jay Roach – Comedy Director of the Decade Award
 Zach Galifianakis – Comedy Star of the Year Award
 Jerry Bruckheimer – Lifetime Achievement Award

ShoWest Convention 2011

 Chloe Bridges & Sasha Pieterse – Breakthrough Performer of the Year Award

ShoWest Convention 2014

 Cameron Deane Stewart, Justin Deeley, Meaghan Martin, Allie Gonino, Ally Maki, Nikki Blonsky, Alex Newell, Scott Bakula, Marin Hinkle & Ana Gasteyer – Ensemble Award

Other conventions
The remaining Nielsen Media event properties include CineEurope held in Barcelona, Spain in June, CineAsia held in early December in varying locations throughout Southeast Asia, and ShowEast, held in late October or early November in the Southeastern United States, usually somewhere in the Miami-Dade area.

American Movie Awards
In 1980, NATO initiated the American Movie Awards, held at the Wilshire Theater, Beverly Hills, California, and broadcast on NBC, with the winners selected based on voting by theater patrons.  Various legal difficulties prevented the awards from being presented in 1981, and the event was discontinued after the 1982 awards due to competition from other awards shows.

CinemaCon Awards 2011
Cameron Diaz - Female Star of the Year Award
Vin Diesel - Action Star of the Year Award
Rosie Huntington-Whiteley - Female Star of Tomorrow Award
Chris Hemsworth - Male Star of Tomorrow Award
Blake Lively - Breakthrough Performer of the Year Award
Ryan Reynolds - Male Star of the Year Award
Harry Potter Film Franchise - Hall of Fame Award
Helen Mirren - Career Achievement Award
Russell Brand - Comedy Star of the Year Award
Morgan Spurlock - Documentary Filmmaker of the Year Award
Tyler Perry - Visionary Award
Jason Momoa - Rising Star of 2011 Award (male)
Julianne Hough - Rising Star of 2011 Award (female)
Sid Ganis - Inter-Society's 2011 Ken Mason Award
Miky Lee - Global Achievement in Exhibition Award
Richard Fox - CinemaCon Passepartout Award
Dick Cook - Pioneer of the Year

CinemaCon Awards 2012
Jennifer Garner - Female Star of the Year Award
Jeremy Renner - Male Star of the Year Award
Dwayne Johnson - Action Star of the Year Award
Anna Faris - Comedy Star of the Year Award
Chloë Grace Moretz - Female Star of Tomorrow Award
Taylor Kitsch - Male Star of Tomorrow Award
Josh Hutcherson - Breakthrough Performer of the Year Award
Charlize Theron - Distinguished Decade of Achievement in Film Award
Michelle Pfeiffer - Cinema Icon Award
Sylvester Stallone - Career Achievement Award
Judd Apatow - Award of Excellence in Filmmaking
Timur Bekmambetov - International Filmmaker of the Year Award
Universal Pictures International's Jack Ledwith - Passepartout Award
Ted Pedas - NATO Marquee Award
Delfin Fernandez - International Achievement in Exhibition Award
Jeffrey Katzenberg - Pioneer of the Year

National Cinema Day

Average U.S. movie ticket price
NATO provides an annual average movie ticket price, in April, each year. In 2019, at $9.16, this stopped, due to Covid closures.  In 2022, box office receipts were 66 percent of 2019, yet attendance levels were 55 percent of 2019. In 2022, IndieWire concluded that average movie ticket prices rose, at least 20 percent, to $11, based on the 2022 second-quarter AMC Theatres earnings call which stated a 22 percent ticket revenue rise compared to the 2019 second-quarter.

See also

Nielsen Business Media (Nielsen Media Film Group)

References

External links
NATO Online - Official site
National Association of Theatre Owners records, MSS 1446 in the L. Tom Perry Special Collections, Harold B. Lee Library, Brigham Young University

1965 establishments in the United States
Cinemas and movie theaters in the United States
Organizations established in 1965
Trade associations based in the United States
Film organizations in the United States